A sinfonietta is a musical group that is larger than a chamber ensemble but smaller than a full-size or symphony orchestra.

There are many orchestras called sinfonietta. Some groups are still a sinfonietta despite not including the word in their name:

 Alarm Will Sound
 American Modern Ensemble
 Amsterdam Sinfonietta
 American Sinfonietta
 Athelas Sinfonietta Copenhagen
 Basel Sinfonietta
 Berlin Sinfonietta
 Berks Sinfonietta
 Dalasinfoniettan
 Toronto Sinfonietta
 BIT20 Ensemble
 Bournemouth Sinfonietta
 Chicago Sinfonietta
 Danish National Chamber Orchestra, also known as the Danish Radio Sinfonietta
 Fukushima Youth Sinfonietta
 Sinfonietta Köln
 Hong Kong Sinfonietta
 Hull Sinfonietta
 Imperial College Sinfonietta
 Israel Sinfonietta Beersheba 
 Kymi Sinfonietta
 Lake Placid Sinfonietta
 Sinfonietta de Lisboa
 Sinfonietta Paris
 Lancashire Sinfonietta
 London Sinfonietta
 Luton Sinfonietta
 Luxembourg Sinfonietta
 Sinfonietta Nova Arnstadt
 Kyiv Sinfonietta
 Orchestra Roma Sinfonietta
 Oslo Sinfonietta
 Praga Sinfonietta Orchestra
 Royal College of Music Sinfonietta
 San Francisco Sinfonietta
 Siam Sinfonietta
 Southampton Youth Sinfonietta Orchestra
 St Helens Sinfonietta
 Stockholm Sinfonietta
 Tapiola Sinfonietta
 Sinfonietta Rīga
 Sinfonietta de Ponta Delgada
 Sinfonietta Cracovia

Types of musical groups